Buningonia Land District is a land district (cadastral division) of Western Australia, located within the Eastern Land Division on the Nullarbor Plain. It spans roughly 30°10'S - 32°00'S in latitude and 122°15'E - 124°00'E in longitude.

Location and features
The district is located on the Nullarbor Plain in the south-east of the state and falls generally East of the city of Kalgoorlie. The Trans-Australian Railway roughly bisects the district. The Aboriginal settlement of Cundeelee and the railway towns of Coonana and Zanthus are located within its boundaries.

History
The district was created on 4 March 1903. The description of the boundaries was subsequently amended on 8 May 1907, and published in the Government Gazette thus:

References

Land districts of Western Australia
Goldfields-Esperance